Seri Sher Shah is a patwar circle within the Pind Kargoo Khan Union Council, Abbottabad District in Khyber-Pakhtunkhwa province of Pakistan. According to the 2017 Census of Pakistan, the population is 4,433.

Subdivisions
Bandi Nikra
Bareela
Bashah Kalan
Bashah Khurd
Chahar
Chatha
Dandhara
Kangar Bala
Pohar
Rata
Seri Sher Shah

References

Populated places in Abbottabad District